Zenino is a rural locality (a selo) and the administrative center of Zeninskoye Rural Settlement, Veydelevsky District, Belgorod Oblast, Russia. The population was 582 as of 2010. There are 11 streets.

Geography 
Zenino is located 15 km northwest of Veydelevka (the district's administrative centre) by road. Kandabarovo is the nearest rural locality.

References 

Rural localities in Veydelevsky District